Marie Louise of Hesse-Kassel (7 February 1688 – 9 April 1765) was a Dutch regent, Princess of Orange by marriage to John William Friso, Prince of Orange, and regent of the Netherlands during the minority of her son and her grandson. She was a daughter of Charles I, Landgrave of Hesse-Kassel, and Maria Amalia of Courland. From 1939 to 1941 and again from 1943 to 2022, she and her husband were the most recent common ancestors of all currently reigning monarchs in Europe.

Marie Louise is notable for having served as regent for two periods in Dutch history: during the reigns of her young son, William IV, Prince of Orange from 1711 and 1730, and of her young grandson, William V, Prince of Orange, from 1759 to 1765. She was often fondly referred to as Marijke Meu (Aunt Mary) by her Dutch subjects.

Life
Marie Louise was one of seventeen children born to Charles I, Landgrave of Hesse-Kassel, by his wife and cousin, Princess Maria Amalia of Courland. Two of her siblings included King Frederick I of Sweden and William VIII, Landgrave of Hesse-Kassel.

Princess of Orange

On 26 April 1709, Marie Louise was married to Johan William, Prince of Orange. He was the eldest surviving son of Henry Casimir II, Prince of Nassau-Dietz, and Henriëtte Amalia of Anhalt-Dessau; he had inherited his title in 1702 from the childless William III, Prince of Orange, due to his descent from both William the Silent and Frederick Henry, Prince of Orange.

The events behind their betrothal began after Johan William was almost killed by cannon fire and roundshot on two occasions. His mother, Henriette Amalia, perhaps realizing how vulnerable her son was, quickly began looking for a suitable bride to ensure an heir. In the end, the choice came down to two German princesses. She apparently informed him that he should think of the choice as between two chairs, and that he should choose the most comfortable of the two. Johan duly traveled to Hesse-Kassel and became engaged to the 20-year-old Marie Louise within a week. He did not even bother meeting the other candidate. The main factor in this decision was probably that Marie Louise's father was a trusted general under the well-respected Duke of Marlborough. In addition, marriage to a daughter of the Landgrave of Hesse-Kassel would also have served to strengthen Johan William's place among the other ruling houses.

Marie Louise was not considered attractive, as her features were heavy and her face was dominated by a large nose. She was however very charming, and greeted those of all ranks with natural friendliness and sincere concern for their well being. They had two children before his untimely death by drowning on 14 July 1711, the youngest of whom was born after his death. William Charles Henry Friso's birth was met with great relief by the Frisians, and he automatically inherited the title Prince of Orange.

First Regency

Since her husband died while she was pregnant, her son William immediately became Prince of Orange upon his birth six weeks later. Marie Louise served as regent for her son from 1711 until he reached his majority in 1731. This regency was granted despite her inexperience with the affairs of her adopted country. 

Although she did not have any experience, Marie Louise successfully withstood a series of natural disasters, which included a sequence of bad harvests and severe winters from 1712 to 1716. At the time of her marriage, Marie Louise quickly earned the affection of the Dutch population. She was known as a woman of intelligence and sensitivity, and was often fondly referred to as Marijke Meu. She also dealt with a major problem concerning shipworms – parasites that upon arriving on ships from the Far East, proceeded to devour wooden sections of the vital, protective dykes. These damages threatened to collapse the entire dyke system, which would have destroyed vast amounts of land used for farming in the Dutch province of Friesland. The money needed to prevent such an occurrence from happening was hard to raise however; tax obligations to the Hague from this province were seldom realistically reviewed. In order to end the looming starvation, Marie Louise traveled to the Hague and pleaded in person before the States-General for help. She apparently spoke so eloquently that she returned home with not only a remittance on taxation, but also with a sizable detachment of soldiers to help repair the dykes.

After a 1736 visit, Marie Louise maintained a correspondence, in "abominable French," with religious and social reformer Count Nikolaus Ludwig of Zinzendorf and Pottendorf. A deeply religious woman, she provided sanctuary to persecuted Protestants fleeing the Catholic Habsburgs. Despite her son's objections, Marie Louise allowed a group of Moravians to settle in the barony of IJsselstein, of which she was baroness.

Traits and relationship with children
After her husband died, Marie Louise found herself a 23-year-old widow residing in a foreign country. She became inherently pessimistic and agonized over the affairs of her children. This pessimistic trait passed onto her daughter Amalia as well, causing her to be melancholy and withdrawn her whole life. Her son William inherited her heavy Germanic looks, rather than "the finely etched ascetic looks which his father had shared with William III". William was sickly as a child, and was rigidly disciplined and educated by Marie Louise with great care in the city of Leeuwarden.

Marie Louise had a good relationship with her son, so that by the time of his coming of age in 1729, she was invited to take equal part in the celebrations. In his youth, she sent him daily letters reminding him to do such things as brush his teeth and get plenty of sleep; he duly responded to each letter patiently.

Marie Louise was described to be frugal, especially in comparison to the excesses of her mother-in-law Henriette Amalia. Due to this frugality, she was able to give large sums to various charitable causes. On one occasion, a nobleman offered her lavish hospitality; she replied by asking if he did not feel guilty at using money he could have donated to the poor.

Son's marriage
Marie Louise's son William married Anne, Princess Royal, eldest daughter of George II of Great Britain, on 25 March 1734 at St James's Palace in London. Upon return of the wedding party to the Netherlands, William had written his mother, warning her that Anne was allowed precedence over Marie Louise because she was his wife and a king's daughter. This warning was hardly needed, as Marie Louise had eagerly exited Prinsenhof as soon as her son came of age, opting to live in an elegant but unpretentious house in Harlingen. She had long displayed her disinterest in royal technicalities and the royal lifestyle. She welcomed her son and his new wife upon their arrival, but then returned to her quiet house, taking no part in their ceremonious entry.

Second Regency
From 1759 until her death in 1765, Marie Louise also served as regent for her young grandson William V, Prince of Orange, after the previous regent (his mother and Marie Louise's daughter-in-law, Anne) died. Marie Louise was succeeded as regent by Duke Louis Ernest of Brunswick-Lüneburg and her granddaughter Princess Caroline of Nassau-Weilburg.

Death
Marie Louise died on 9 April 1765 in Leeuwarden, the capital city of the Dutch province of Friesland. She outlived her son William by 14 years.

Issue

Ancestry

References

Sources

External links

|-

|-

1688 births
1765 deaths
House of Hesse-Kassel
Nobility from Kassel
House of Orange-Nassau
Princesses of Orange
Dutch princesses
Dutch regents
18th-century women rulers
Daughters of monarchs